Congorama  is a French-Belgian-Canadian film directed by Philippe Falardeau, released in 2006.

Plot
Michel is a Belgian inventor. He cares for his father, a paralysed writer, is married to a Congolese woman and is the father of an interracial child whom he reassures as to his parentage. He discovers at the age of 41 that he was adopted, actually having been born in Sainte-Cécile, Quebec. In the summer of 2000, he travels to Quebec, supposedly to sell some of his inventions. While on a near-impossible quest to find his birth family in the town where he was born, he crosses paths with Louis Legros, son of another inventor, in a meeting which will change their lives.

Premiere
Congorama received its world premiere at the Directors' Fortnight series held alongside the 2006 Cannes Film Festival.

Awards
Genie Award – Screenplay; Prix Jutra – Picture, Director, Screenplay, Actor (Ahmarani, Gourmet), Supporting Actor (Arcand)

References

External links
 Lecinéma.com
 
 

2006 films
Canadian drama films
Films directed by Philippe Falardeau
Best Film Prix Iris winners
2000s French-language films
2006 drama films
French drama films
Belgian drama films
French-language Canadian films
2000s Canadian films
2000s French films